The 2019 Far North local elections will take place between September and October 2019 by postal vote in Far North District in New Zealand to elect a mayor of Far North District council, 9 councillors, and 19 community board members.

Mayoral election
There are 11 candidates running for Mayor of Far North District. They are listed below in alphabetical order. The incumbent mayor- John Carter- is seeking re-election. Carter served since the 2013 New Zealand local elections. Candidates with no listed party affiliation are listed as unaffiliated.

Candidates

Results

District council
There are 9 councillors in Far North District Council, elected from 3 multi-member wards. The 3 wards are Bay of Islands-Whangaroa, Kaikohe-Hokianga Ward and Te Hiku Ward.

Bay of Islands-Whangaroa 
Bay of Islands-Whangaroa ward elects 4 members to the Far North District Council. It contains, among others, Kerikeri, the eponymous Whangaroa, Paihia and Kawakawa. There are 15 candidates running for Bay of Islands-Whangaroa ward. They are listed below in alphabetical order.

Candidates

Kaikohe-Hokianga
Kaikohe-Hoikianga ward elects 2 members to the Far North District Council. It contains, among others, the eponymous Kaikohe, Rawene and Oponi. There are 12 candidates running for Kaikohe-Hokianga ward. They are listed below in alphabetical order.

Candidates

Te Hiku
Te Hiku ward elects 3 members to the Far North District Council. It contains, among others, Kaitaia, Awanui, Whatuwhiwhi and Te Kao. There are 15 candidates running for Te Hiku ward. They are listed below in alphabetical order.

Candidates

Community boards
Elections will be required for 3 community boards located in the Far North District. These are the 7-member Bay of Islands-Whangaroa Community Board, the 6-member Kaikohe-Hokianga Community Board, and the 6-member Te Hiku Community Board.

Bay of Islands-Whangaroa Community Board
The Bay of Islands-Whangaroa Community Board consists of 7 members and contains 4 single-member subdivisions and 1 multi-member subdivision.

Kawakawa-Moerewa
Kawakawa-Moerewa subdivision elects 1 member to the Bay of Islands-Whangaroa Community Board.

Candidates

Kerikeri
Kerikeri subdivision elects 3 members to the Bay of Islands-Whangaroa Community Board. As the number of nominated candidates was equal to the amount of vacancies, all candidates were elected unopposed.

Results

Paihia
Paihia subdivision elects 1 member to the Bay of Islands-Whangaroa Community Board.

Candidates

Russell-Opua
Russell-Opua subdivision elects 1 member to the Bay of Islands-Whangaroa Community Board.

Candidates

Whangaroa
Whangaroa subdivision elects 1 member to the Bay of Islands-Whangaroa Community Board.

Candidates

Kaikohe-Hokianga Community Board
The Kaikohe-Hokianga Community Board consists of 6 members and contains 1 single-member subdivision and 2 multi-member subdivisions.

Kaikohe
Kaikohe subdivision elects 3 members to the Kaikohe-Hokianga Community Board.

Candidates

North Hokianga
North Hokianga subdivision elects 1 member to the Kaikohe-Hokianga Community Board.

Candidates

South Hokianga
South Hokianga subdivision elects 2 members to the Kaikohe-Hokianga Community Board. As the number of nominated candidates was equal to the amount of vacancies, all candidates were elected unopposed.

Results

Te Hiku Community Board
The Te Hiku Community Board consists of 6 members and contains 3 single-member subdivisions and 1 multi-member subdivision.

Doubtless Bay
Doubtless Bay subdivision elects 1 member to the Te Hiku Community Board.

Candidates

Kaitaia
Kaitaia subdivision elects 3 members to the Te Hiku Community Board.

Candidates

North Cape
North Cape subdivision elects 1 member to the Te Hiku Community Board. As the number of nominated candidates was equal to the amount of vacancies, all candidates were elected unopposed.

Results

Whatuwhiwhi
Whatuwhiwhi subdivision elects 1 member to the Te Hiku Community Board.

Candidates

References

Far North